Santa Catarina Park is one of the largest parks in Funchal, Madeira, Portugal.

History
The site of the park was originally occupied by a chapel. The chapel, called Santa Catarina Chapel, was built out of wood in the early 1400s, and then upgraded to stone in the 1600s.

Description
It has multiple aviaries, and is located near the Bay of Funchal. There are several paths with benches, in addition to some statues and Santa Catarina Chapel.

Gallery

References

Parks in Madeira
Tourist attractions in Madeira